Eugenio Rossi (born 6 March 1992) is an athlete from San Marino specialising in the high jump. His personal best of 2.27 metres is the best performance ever by a Sammarinese track and field athlete in any event. He represented his country at two outdoor and two indoor European Championships and in addition has won several medals at the Games of the Small States of Europe.

He has personal bests of 2.27 metres outdoors (Caprino Veronese 2015) and 2.24 metres indoors (Ancona 2018). Both are current national records.

Rossi is coached by Giulio Ciotti.

Competition record

References

1992 births
Living people
Sammarinese high jumpers
Male high jumpers
Sammarinese male athletes
World Athletics Championships athletes for San Marino
Athletes (track and field) at the 2013 Mediterranean Games
Athletes (track and field) at the 2018 Mediterranean Games
Athletes (track and field) at the 2015 European Games
European Games competitors for San Marino
Athletes (track and field) at the 2016 Summer Olympics
Olympic athletes of San Marino
Mediterranean Games competitors for San Marino